Rasmus Byriel Iversen (born 16 September 1997) is a Danish cyclist, who currently rides for Danish amateur team Herning CK.

Major results
2014
 5th Kuurne–Brussels–Kuurne Juniors
 5th Omloop der Vlaamse Gewesten
2015
 5th Kuurne–Brussels–Kuurne Juniors
2019
1st  Young rider classification ZLM Tour

References

External links

1997 births
Living people
Danish male cyclists
People from Haderslev Municipality
Sportspeople from the Region of Southern Denmark